"My Mind & Me" is a song recorded by American singer Selena Gomez. It was released on November 3, 2022, by Interscope Records, as a single for Selena Gomez: My Mind & Me, a 2022 documentary film.

Critical reception 
Jon Pareles wrote in a review for The New York Times that the music moved from "fragility to determination" and from "lone, echoey piano notes" to a "supportive march and a mission statement".

On December 21, 2022, it was announced that the song had made the shortlist for the Academy Award for Best Original Song.

Accolades

Charts

Release history

References

2020s ballads
2022 singles
2022 songs
Selena Gomez songs
Songs written by Selena Gomez
Interscope Records singles
Song recordings produced by the Monsters & Strangerz
Songs written by Jon Bellion
Songs written by Jordan Johnson (songwriter)
Songs written by Stefan Johnson
Songs written by Amy Allen (songwriter)
Songs written by Michael Pollack (musician)